A chromosomal fragile site is a specific heritable point on a chromosome that tends to form a gap or constriction and may tend to break  when the cell is exposed to partial replication stress. Based on their frequency, fragile sites are classified as "common" or "rare". To date, more than 120 fragile sites have been identified in the human genome.

Common fragile sites are considered part of normal chromosome structure and are present in all (or nearly all) individuals in a population. Under normal conditions, most common fragile sites are not prone to spontaneous breaks. Common fragile sites are of interest in cancer studies because they are frequently affected in cancer and they can be found in healthy individuals. Sites FRA3B (harboring the FHIT gene) and FRA16D (harboring the WWOX gene) are two well known examples and have been a major focus of research.

Rare fragile sites are found in less than 5% of the population, and are often composed of two- or three-nucleotide repeats. They are often susceptible to spontaneous breakage during replication, frequently affecting neighboring genes. Clinically, the most important rare fragile site is FRAXA in the FMR1 gene, which is associated with the fragile X syndrome, the most common cause of hereditary intellectual disability. For detailed information regarding each characterized fragile site, please visit HumCFS: a database of fragile sites in human chromosomes, published in BMC Genomics.

Rare fragile sites

Classification
Rare fragile sites (RFSs) are classified into two sub-groups based on the compounds that elicit breakage: folate-sensitive groups (for examples, see ), and nonfolate-sensitive groups, which are induced by bromodeoxyuridine (BrdU) or distamycin A, an antibiotic that preferentially binds to AT-pairs of DNA.   The folate-sensitive group is characterized by an expansion of CGG repeats, while the nonfolate-sensitive group contains many AT-rich minisatellite repeats.

Mechanisms of instability
The CGG and AT-rich repeats characteristic of RFSs can form hairpins  and other non-B DNA structures that block replication forks and can result in breakage.  DNA polymerase has been shown to pause at CTG and CGG triplet repeat sequences, which can result in continual expansion via slippage.

Common fragile sites

Classification
Unlike RFSs, common fragile sites (CFSs) are not the result of nucleotide repeat expansion mutations.  They are a part of the normal human genome and are typically stable when not under replicative stress.  The majority of breakages at CFSs are induced by low doses of the antibiotic aphidicolin .  Co-treatment with low concentrations of the topoisomerase I inhibitor, camptothecin (CPT), reduces APH-induced breakage.  CFS regions are highly conserved in mouse and other species, including primates, cat, dog, pig, horse, cow, Indian mole rat, and yeast (for review, see ).  While CFSs could be a result of higher-order chromosome structure, the conservation throughout species could also indicate that they may have some conserved biological purpose.

Mechanisms of instability
The instability of CFSs is proposed to stem from late replication: CFSs are likely to initiate proper replication but slow to complete it, introducing breaks from unreplicated regions of DNA.  Late-replication may be a result of formation of non-B DNA structures like hairpins and toroids that stall the replication fork in AT rich regions, analogous to the proposed mechanism of rare fragile site instability.  Ataxia-telengiectasia and Rad3 Related (ATR) checkpoint kinase is required for maintaining stability of CFS under both stressed and normal replicating conditions.  Breakage is reduced after treatment with CPT (camptothecin) (without APH), signifying that CPT also has a necessary role in stabilizing CFSs.

Clinical relevance
	Fragile sites are associated with numerous disorders and diseases, both heritable and not.  The FRAXA site is perhaps most famous for its role in Fragile X syndrome, but fragile sites are clinically implicated in many other important diseases, such as cancer.
	FRA3B and FRA16D lie within the large tumor-suppressor genes, FHIT and WWOX, respectively.  High frequency of deletions at breakpoints within these fragile sites has been associated with many cancers, including breast, lung, and gastric cancers (for review, see  )
	MicroRNA genes, which are preferentially involved in chromosomal alterations, are frequently located at fragile sites.  Chromosomal alterations may lead to deregulation of microRNA, which could be of diagnostic and prognostic significance for cancers. 
	Additionally, the Hepatitis B virus (HBV) and HPV-16 virus, the strain of human papilloma virus most likely to produce cancer, appear to integrate preferentially in or around fragile sites, and it has been proposed that this is crucial to the development of tumors. 
	Fragile sites have also been implicated in a variety of syndromes (for a review, see ).  For example, breakage at or near the FRA11b locus has been implicated in Jacobsen syndrome, which is characterized by loss of part of the long arm of chromosome 11 accompanied by mild mental retardation.  The FRAXE site is associated in the development of a form of mental retardation without any distinctive phenotypic features.  Seckel syndrome, a genetic disease characterized by low levels of ATR, results in increased instability of chromosomes at fragile sites.

Fragile sites and affected genes

 FRA1A
 FRA1B (DAB1 gene)
 FRA1C
 FRA1D
 FRA1E (DPYD gene)
 FRA1F
 FRA1G
 FRA1H
 FRA1I
 FRA1J
 FRA1K
 FRA1L
 FRA1M
 FRA2A
 FRA2B
 FRA2C
 FRA2D
 FRA2E
 FRA2F (LRP1B gene)
 FRA2G
 FRA2H
 FRA2I
 FRA2J
 FRA2K
 FRA2L
 FRA3A
 FRA3B (FHIT gene)
 FRA3C (NAALADL2 gene)
 FRA3D
 FRA4A
 FRA4B
 FRA4C
 FRA4D
 FRA4E
 FRA4F (GRID2 gene)
 FRA5A
 FRA5B
 FRA5C
 FRA5D
 FRA5E
 FRA5F
 FRA5G
 FRA5H (PDE4D gene)
 FRA6A
 FRA6B
 FRA6C
 FRA6D
 FRA6E (PARK2 gene)
 FRA6F
 FRA6G
 FRA6H
 FRA7A
 FRA7B
 FRA7C
 FRA7D
 FRA7E
 FRA7F
 FRA7G
 FRA7H
 FRA7I (CNTNAP2 gene)
 FRA7J
 FRA7K (IMMP2L gene)
 FRA8A
 FRA8B
 FRA8C
 FRA8D
 FRA8E
 FRA8F
 FRA9A
 FRA9B
 FRA9C
 FRA9D
 FRA9E
 FRA9F
 FRA9G
 FRA10A
 FRA10B
 FRA10C
 FRA10D (CTNNA3 gene)
 FRA10E
 FRA10F
 FRA10G
 FRA11A
 FRA11B
 FRA11C
 FRA11D
 FRA11E
 FRA112F (DLG2 gene)
 FRA11G
 FRA11H
 FRA11I
 FRA12A
 FRA12B
 FRA12C
 FRA12D
 FRA12E
 FRA13A (NBEA gene)
 FRA13B
 FRA13C
 FRA13D
 FRA13E
 FRA14B (GPHN gene)
 FRA14C
 FRA15A (RORA gene)
 FRA16A
 FRA16B
 FRA16C
 FRA16D (WWOX gene)
 FRA16E
 FRA17A
 FRA17B
 FRA18A 
 FRA18B
 FRA18C
 FRA19A
 FRA19B
 FRA20A
 FRA20B
 FRA22A
 FRA22B
 FRAXB
 FRAXC (IL1RAPL1/DMD gene)
 FRAXD
 FRAXA
 FRAXE 
 FRAXF

References

Cytogenetics